The 1995 Qatar Crown Prince Cup was the 1st edition of this cup tournament in men's football (soccer). It was played by the top 4 teams of the Q-League.

Al-Rayyan were crowned champions defeating Al-Arabi in the final.

Results

Qatar Crown Prince Cup
1994–95 in Qatari football